Burgers and Fries/When I Stop Leaving (I'll Be Gone) is the twenty-fifth studio album by American country music artist Charley Pride. It was released in October 1978 via RCA Victor Records and contained ten tracks. It was co-produced by Pride and Jerry Bradley. The project was Pride's twenty fifth studio release in his recording career and reached major chart positions in the United States and Canada. Three singles were released off the album, including both of its title tracks and "Where Do I Put Her Memory." All three singles became major hits on the country charts in the United States and Canada.

Background and content
Charley Pride became initially successful from his traditional country style, which was found throughout his early work in the late 1960s and the early 1970s. As musical tastes changed in country music, Pride's style shifted towards country pop. According to writers such as Stephen Thomas Erlewine, certain physical characteristics contributed to this successful musical shift, notably Pride's baritone voice range. This country pop influence was found on later 1970s albums, including Burgers and Fries/When I Stop Leaving (I'll Be Gone).

The record was recorded in 1977 at the Music City Hall studio, located in Nashville, Tennessee. It was Pride's first recording session for an album at the latter studio. The sessions were co-produced by Pride and his recent collaborator, Jerry Bradley. The album consisted of ten tracks. All of the songs were newly recorded material for Pride. Both of the project's title tracks were new recordings, as well as two more cuts composed by Ben Peters. The track, "I Can See Lovin' in Your Eyes," was co-written by Pride, along with two additional collaborators.

Release and reception

Burgers and Fries/When I Stop Leaving (I'll Be Gone) was initially released in October 1978 on the RCA Victor label. It would mark Pride's twenty fifth studio album release in his career. The record was initially released as both a vinyl LP and a cassette. In later decades, it was re-released in a digital format for downloads and streaming purposes. It spent a total of 32 weeks on the Billboard Top Country Albums chart. In December 1978, the record peaked at number seven on the chart. It reached a similar position on the Canadian RPM Country Albums chart, reaching number four. In later years it would receive a four-star rating from Allmusic, who named its title track ("Burgers and Fries") an "album pick."

Three singles were released from the album. Its first was one of its title tracks, "When I Stop Leavin' (I'll Be Gone)," which was issued as a single in May 1978. The song would peak at number three on the Billboard Hot Country Songs chart by August. Its second single release was also a title track, "Burgers and Fries." It was officially released in October 1978. It spent 14 weeks on the Billboard country chart and reached number two by December. Its third (and final) single release was "Where Do I Put Her Memory," in February 1979. By April 1979, the single had reached number one on the Billboard country songs list. All three singles would also reach number one on the RPM Country Singles chart in Canada.

Track listings

Vinyl version

Cassette version

Digital version

Personnel
All credits are adapted from the liner notes of Burgers and Fries/When I Stop Leaving (I'll Be Gone).

Musical personnel
 Hayward Bishop – drums
 Harold Bradley – bass guitar
 David Briggs – piano
 Sonny Garrish – steel guitar
 Johnny Gimble – fiddle
 The Jordanaires – background vocals
 Mike Leach – bass
 Charlie McCoy – harmonica, vibes
 Charley Pride – lead vocals
 Dale Sellers – guitar
 Pete Wade – guitar
 Tommy Williams – fiddle
 Chip Young – guitar

Technical personnel
 Jerry Bradley – producer
 Herb Burnette – art direction
 Sam Causey – photography
 Dan Dea – engineer
 Bill Harris – engineer
 Randy Kling – mastering
 Charley Pride – producer
 Bergen White – arrangement

Chart performance

Release history

References

1978 albums
Albums produced by Jerry Bradley (music executive)
Albums produced by Charley Pride
Charley Pride albums
RCA Victor albums